Guillermo Lorenzo (born 5 January 1939) is an Argentine former footballer. He was also part of Argentina's squad for the 1960 Summer Olympics, but he did not play in any matches.

References

1939 births
Living people
Association football defenders
Argentine footballers
Boca Juniors footballers
Footballers from Buenos Aires